"New Religion" is a song by Swedish singer Anton Ewald. It was performed in Melodifestivalen 2021 and made it to the 13 March final.

Charts

References

2021 songs
2021 singles
Melodifestivalen songs of 2021